Stéphane Lecocq (born October 22, 1976 in Auchel) is a French professional football player. Currently, he plays in the Championnat de France amateur for USL Dunkerque.

He played on the professional level in Ligue 2 for Amiens SC.

See also
Football in France
List of football clubs in France

References

1976 births
Living people
French footballers
Ligue 2 players
Amiens SC players
AS Beauvais Oise players
FC Rouen players
AS Cherbourg Football players
AS Cannes players
Association football forwards
Wasquehal Football players